Beatrice Eileen Armstrong (11 January 1894 – 12 March 1981) was a British diver who competed in the 1920 Summer Olympics and in the 1924 Summer Olympics. She was born in Hendon, Middlesex.

In 1920 she won the silver medal in the 10 metre platform competition. Four years later she was eliminated in the first round of the 10 metre platform event after finishing sixth in her heat.

References

External links
profile

1894 births
1981 deaths
British female divers
Olympic divers of Great Britain
Divers at the 1920 Summer Olympics
Divers at the 1924 Summer Olympics
English Olympic medallists
Olympic silver medallists for Great Britain
People from Hendon
Olympic medalists in diving
Medalists at the 1920 Summer Olympics
20th-century British women